Packer Farm and Barkersville Store is a historic farm and general store and national historic district located at Middle Grove, Saratoga County, New York. The district encompasses four contributing buildings and one contributing structure in the Town of Providence.  They are the Packer house (c. 1825-1859), frame English barn (c. 1825 and later), frame store (c. 1893 and later), second frame barn with attached shed (c. 1860), and a dam. The Packer house is a two-story, frame dwelling moved to its present location about 1857, along with the English barn.  The house exhibits Federal and Greek Revival style design elements.

It was listed on the National Register of Historic Places in 2013.

References

Historic districts on the National Register of Historic Places in New York (state)
Federal architecture in New York (state)
Greek Revival houses in New York (state)
Houses completed in 1859
Commercial buildings completed in 1893
Buildings and structures in Saratoga County, New York
National Register of Historic Places in Saratoga County, New York
Farms on the National Register of Historic Places in New York (state)
Commercial buildings on the National Register of Historic Places in New York (state)